Zoila decipiens, common names the "humpback cowry" or "deceptive cowry", is a species of sea snail, a cowry, a marine gastropod mollusk in the family Cypraeidae, the cowries. This shell got its Latin name decipiens, meaning deceiving, from the fact that its damaged holotype was wrongly classified as Zoila thersites.

Description
The shell is  rather heavy, its shape is globular, almost inflated. Dorsum is distinctly arched. Its color is pale brown and more or less densely covered with brown irregular dark brown spots, while the dorsal line is lighter and usually clearly visible. Dorsal surface is separated from the edges by a dark brown frame. The base is dark brown and almost flat, with angled edges. The mouth is narrow, the short teeth are darker than the base and are present on both lips.

Distribution
This endemic species occurs in the sea along North West Australia. The shells have been most frequently found by divers from an area SW of Broome, (Australia).

Habitat

Subspecies
 Zoila decipiens decipiens  Smith, 1880
 Zoila decipiens suprasinum  Lorenz, 2002

References
 Lorenz F. & Hubert A. (2000) A guide to worldwide cowries. Edition 2. Hackenheim: Conchbooks. 584 pp

External links
 Biolib
 
 Cowries
 Cypraeidae
 Marine Species WoRMS

Cypraeidae
Gastropods described in 1880